NGC 2362, also known as Caldwell 64, is an open cluster of stars in the southern constellation of Canis Major. It was discovered by the Italian court astronomer Giovanni Batista Hodierna, who published his finding in 1654. William Herschel called it a "beautiful cluster", while William Henry Smyth said it "has a beautiful appearance, the bright white star being surrounded by a rich gathering of minute companions, in a slightly elongated form, and nearly vertical position". In the past it has also been listed as a nebula, but in 1930 Robert J. Trumpler found no evidence of nebulosity. The brightest member star system is Tau Canis Majoris, and therefore it is sometimes called the Tau Canis Majoris Cluster.

The cluster is located at a distance of approximately 1.48 kpc from the Sun, and appears associated with the giant nebula Sh2-310 that lies at the same distance, about one degree to the east. This giant H II region is being ionized by the brighter members of the NGC 2362 cluster.

NGC 2362 is a relatively young 4–5 million years in age but is devoid of star-forming gas and dust, indicating that the star formation process has come to a halt. It is a massive open cluster, with more than 500 solar masses, an estimated 100-150 member stars, and an additional 500 forming a halo around the cluster. Of these cluster members, only around 35 show evidence of a debris disk. There is one slightly evolved O-type star, Tau Canis Majoris, and around 40 B-type stars still on the main sequence. Only one candidate classical Be star has been found, as of 2005.

Gallery

References

External links 

 
 

Open clusters
Canis Major
2362
064b